Claudia von Alemann (born 23 March 1943 in Seebach) is a German filmmaker.

Personal life
Claudia von Alemann is the daughter of German military officer Hans von Alemann Heine and his wife Ludmilla. She majored in sociology and art history at the Berlin Free University. After graduation, she attended the Ulm School of Design at the Institute for filmmaking. She is married to Cuban director Fernando Pérez and they have a daughter.

Filmography
1966: Easy (Short Film)
1967: EXPMNTL Knokke (TV documentary)
1967: Foundling (short film)
1968: This Is Only the Beginning - The Fight Will Continue (TV documentary)
1969: Short Film Festival Oberhausen (TV documentary)
1970: Kathleen and Eldridge Cleaver (short documentary)
1970: Brigitte (TV documentary short)
1971: Germaine Greer (TV documentary short)
1971: FLQ Montreal (TV documentary short)
1971: Anti-imperialist Women's Congress in Toronto (TV documentary short)
1971: Tu luc van doan - through its own efforts (short documentary)
1972: Contract (TV documentary short)
1972: Accidents at work (TV documentary short)
1973: It Depends, Is to Change it (documentary)
1974: Namibia (documentary)
1977: Films of the Sun and the Night: Ariane Mnouchkine (documentary)
1981: 
1981: The Women's Room
1982: Nebelland
1984: The Door in the Wall (TV)
2000: Vladimir Affordable - A Trojan affair (actress)
2000: Shadows of Memory
2001: Was once a wild Aquarius
2011: The woman with the camera: Portrait of the photographer Abisag Tüllmann

References

External links

1943 births
Living people
German women film directors
Film directors from Thuringia
Free University of Berlin alumni
People from Wartburgkreis